The Bridge of the Horns is a proposed construction project to build a bridge between the coasts of Djibouti and Yemen, across the Bab-el-Mandeb, between the Red Sea and Gulf of Aden. It would be constructed by Al Noor Holding Investment.  In 2010, it was announced that Phase I had been delayed. In 2015, civil war broke out again in Yemen. As of July 2021, nothing more has been heard of the project, and it is currently presumed to be indefinitely suspended or cancelled.

Prospective structure
It was proposed by the Dubai-based firm Middle East Development LLC headed by Tarek Bin Laden. The opening date was expected to be in the year 2020.

It would have to allow very large ships of the Suezmax size in both directions simultaneously.

It was anticipated that about 100,000 cars and 50,000 rail passengers would cross the bridge daily.

Expected use
Twin cities, referred to as Al Noor City, would be built on either end of the bridge; the prospective site's developers indicate that they will run on renewable energy. On the Djibouti side, President Ismael Omar Guelleh granted  to build Noor City, the first of the hundreds of Cities of Light which the Saudi Binladen Group envisions building. The developers state that they expect Noor City to have 2.5 million residents by 2025, and the Yemeni twin city to have 4.5 million, while they envision a new airport serving both cities at a capacity of 100 million passengers annually. A new highway connecting the cities to Dubai is proposed, though there are no plans for roads to connect sparsely populated Djibouti with the population centers of Addis Ababa in Ethiopia or Khartoum in Sudan. One of the uses that are imagined for this bridge is for easy transcontinental access to the Hajj in Mecca.

The Economist magazine, noting that developers state that the project will make Noor City the "financial, educational, and medical hub of Africa", commented, "Africans may wonder why the hub is not being built in a bit of Africa where more Africans live and which has food and water."

Timeline
 2009
 Original planned start

 December 2009
 Yemen-Djibouti bridge gets go-ahead

 June 2010
 Phase I of Yemen and Djibouti Causeway delayed

See also

 Al Noor City
 Gibraltar Bridge
 Intercontinental and transoceanic fixed links
 List of bridge-tunnels
 Qatar–Bahrain Friendship Bridge
 Saudi-Egypt Causeway
 Strait of Messina Bridge
 Sunda Strait Bridge
 Transport in Djibouti
 Yemeni Civil War (2015–present)

References

External links
COWI link in English (via Wayback Machine)
, company website.
Notice-to-Proceed Launches Ambitious Red Sea Crossing
Tarek Bin Laden's Red Sea bridge
Can it really be bridged?
A Vision to Connect Africa and Asia, Spiegel Online 22 August 2008
St Tropez in the Horn?

Red Sea
Rail transport in Africa
Road transport in Africa
Transport in Djibouti
Transport in Yemen
Bridges in Djibouti
Bridges in Yemen
International bridges
Proposed bridges in Africa
Djibouti–Yemen relations
Proposed transcontinental crossings
Proposed infrastructure in Djibouti
Proposed infrastructure in Yemen
Proposed bridges in Asia